Sarnikierz  is a village in the administrative district of Gmina Węgorzyno, within Łobez County, West Pomeranian Voivodeship, in north-western Poland.

The village has a population of 33.

References

Sarnikierz